Events in the year 1944 in the Netherlands.

Incumbents
 Monarch: Wilhelmina
 Prime Minister: Pieter Sjoerds Gerbrandy

Events 
17 to 20 September – Battle of Nijmegen
17 to 26 September – Battle of Arnhem
30 September to 18 October – Battle of Overloon
3 October to 8 November – Battle of the Scheldt
27 to 30 November – Battle of Broekhuizen
Dutch famine of 1944–45

Births 

2 January – Willy Dobbe, television presenter and announcer
23 January – Rutger Hauer, actor, writer and environmentalist (d. 2019)
16 March – Pieter de Zwart, sailor.
1 April – Theo Hiddema, lawyer, media personality and politician
5 April – Willeke van Ammelrooy, actress and director 
26 April – Huib Ruijgrok, footballer
20 May – Boudewijn de Groot, singer-songwriter
24 May – Heleen Sancisi-Weerdenburg, ancient historian (d. 2000)
10 June – Eegje Schoo, politician and diplomat
15 July – Klaas de Vries, composer
27 July – Philip Freriks, journalist, columnist and television presenter 
3 August – Willem H. Vanderburg, engineer
11 August – Bean van Limbeek, sport shooter (d. 2014).
30 August – Freek de Jonge, cabaret performer and writer
13 September – Gerrit Jan van Ingen Schenau, biomechanist (d. 1998)
23 September – Jan Dijkema, politician, sociologist and sports director
15 October – Vilma Henkelman, sculptor, ceramist, and photographer
29 October – Robbie van Leeuwen, musician
5 December – Jeroen Krabbé, actor and film director

Full date missing
Max Bolleman, jazz drummer, audio engineer and record producer
Kommer Damen, businessman
Tim Griek, musician and producer (d. 1988) 
Sytse Strijbos, academic
Tjebbe van Tijen, sculptor, performance artist, curator, net artist, archivist, and media theorist

Deaths 

1 February – Piet Mondrian, painter and theoretician (b. 1872)
2 February – Tjapko van Bergen, rower and SS Rottenführer (b. 1903).
8 February – Joop Kolkman, journalist and diplomat (b. 1896)
20 February – Albert Heijnneman, sprinter (b. 1896).
29 February – Abraham Mok, gymnast (b. 1888).
6 March – Eva and Abraham Beem, Jewish siblings and victims of the Holocaust (b. 1932 and 1934)
6 March – Simon Okker, fencer (b. 1881).
9 March – Casper ten Boom,  helped many Jews and resisters escape the Nazis during the Holocaust of World War II (b. 1859)
6 April – W. F. Gisolf, geologist (b. 1884) 
13 April – Friedrich Gutmann, banker and art collector (b. 1886)
30 May – Marinus Adrianus Koekkoek the Younger, painter (b. 1873)
10 June – Willem Jacob van Stockum, mathematician (b. 1910)
10 June – Gerrit van der Veen, sculptor (b. 1902)
18 July – Wim Anderiesen, footballer (b. 1903)
31 July – Settela Steinbach, holocaust victim (b. 1934)
4 August – Hans Mossel, clarinetist and saxophonist (b. 1905)
7 August – Johannes Scheuter, sport shooter (b. 1880).
11 August – Joop Westerweel, schoolteacher and World War II resistance leader (b. 1899)
18 August – Dirk Boonstra, resistance membe (b. 1920)
2 September – Hendrikus Albertus Lorentz, explorer and diplomat (b. 1871)
3 September – Ernst de Jonge, lawyer, Olympic rower and member of the Dutch resistance (b. 1914).
6 September – Lion van Minden, fencer (b. 1880).
8 September – Jan van Gilse, composer and conductor (b. 1881)
9 September – Dirk Boonstra, police commander (b. 1893)
15 September – Walter Middelberg, rower (b. 1875).
19 September – Jan van Hoof, resistance member (b. 1922)
4 October – Maurits van Löben Sels, fencer (b. 1876).
7 October – Jacobus Kann, banker (b. 1872)
18 October – Juda Lion Palache, linguist (b. 1886)
21 October – Adri Bleuland van Oordt, artist and draftswoman (b. 1862)
5 November – Willy Dols, linguist (b. 1911)
6 December – Boy Ecury, resistance member (b. 1922)
16 December – Betsie ten Boom, resistance member (b. 1885)
18 December – M. H. J. Schoenmaekers, mathematician (b. 1875)
28 December – Tjeerd Pasma, modern pentathlete (b. 1904).

See also
Chronology of the liberation of Dutch cities and towns during World War II

References

 
1940s in the Netherlands
Years of the 20th century in the Netherlands
Netherlands
Netherlands